Softball has been a South American Games event since 1994 in Valencia, Venezuela.

Women

Summary

Medal table

Participating nations

External links
Brazilian Baseball Softball Federation

South American Games
South American Games
Softball